The Ping-Lin Tea Museum, also spelled Pinglin Tea Museum, is a museum located in the hills of Pinglin District, New Taipei, Taiwan. It is one of the world's largest tea museums.

Ping-Lin is renowned for producing Pouchong tea. The picking of the "spring tea" starts around the end of March.

History
The museum was opened on 12 January 1997.

Architecture
The museum is built in Fujianese architecture, with a large circular courtyard along with long halls and round doors.

Exhibitions
There are three main exhibition halls which show the history and process of growing tea, as well as an exhibition about tea leaves. There is also an experience center, Where people can appreciate tea through interactive installations, as well as a museum shop, where visitors can buy tea, And a tea room, where people can taste it. An ecological park and trail exists behind the museum, which features a carp pool, a waterfall, and a tea flower forest. Rare insects and cultivated plant life can also be seen. A statue of the sea goddess Mazu exists in the ecological park.

Opening time
The museum opens everyday from 9 a.m. to 5 p.m. on weekdays and 9.00 a.m. to 5:30 p.m. on weekends. It closes on the first Monday of each month, as well as during the Chinese New Year or during natural disasters.

Admission fee
The museum will reinstitute an entry fee starting on 2016/7/1. The fee is NT$ 80 per person. Residents of New Taipei, those 65 and over or under 12, students, disabled people, low-income earners, and military veterans can enter free.

Transportation
The museum is accessible by buses Green 12 and 923 from the Xindian metro station.

See also
 List of museums in Taiwan
 Tenfu Tea Museum
 Tea Research and Extension Station

References

1997 establishments in Taiwan
Museums established in 1997
Food museums in Taiwan
Industry museums
Museums in New Taipei
Tea museums
Chinese tea